Egoist is a Japanese pop music duo consisting of songwriter Ryo of Supercell and vocalist Chelly. Originally formed to produce theme music for the 2011 anime television series Guilty Crown, the group continued creating other songs after the end of the series including themes for other anime television series including Psycho-Pass and Kabaneri of the Iron Fortress. Egoist's debut album Extra terrestrial Biological Entities was released in September 2012.

History
In 2011, Ryo of Supercell was tasked with composing theme music for the anime television series Guilty Crown. That year, Supercell held auditions from May 25 to June 19 for the vocalist on the band's third studio album Zigaexperientia (2013), and Ryo was also searching for the vocalist of Egoist, a fictional band featured in Guilty Crown. Out of about 2,000 candidates, then 17-year-old female singer Chelly was chosen to sing under the persona of the band's vocalist Inori Yuzuriha. Egoist's debut single  was released on November 30, 2011; the song was used as Guilty Crown first ending theme.

Egoist's second single is "The Everlasting Guilty Crown" released on March 7, 2012; the song was used as Guilty Crown second opening theme. Included on Egoist's first two singles are remixes of the title songs by Boom Boom Satellites. Egoist's debut album Extra terrestrial Biological Entities was released on September 19, 2012. Egoist's third single  was released on December 5, 2012; the song is used as the first ending theme to the 2012 anime series Psycho-Pass.

Egoist's fourth single "All Alone With You" was released on March 6, 2013; the song is used as the second ending theme to Psycho-Pass. Egoist released the digital single  on November 6, 2013. Egoist's fifth single "Fallen" was released on November 19, 2014; the song is used as the ending theme to the 2014 anime series Psycho-Pass 2. The band's sixth single  was released on November 11, 2015; the song will be used as the theme song to the anime film Genocidal Organ. Egoist's seventh single "Kabaneri of the Iron Fortress" was released on May 25, 2016; the song is used as the opening theme to the 2016 anime series Kabaneri of the Iron Fortress.

Egoist moved to the Sacra Music record label under Sony Music Entertainment Japan in April 2017. Egoist's eighth single  was released on August 16, 2017; the song is used as the opening theme of the 2017 anime series Fate/Apocrypha. Egoist released the compilation album Greatest Hits 2011-2017 "Alter Ego" on December 27, 2017.

In November 2018, Chelly began the process of leaving Egoist to start a solo career. Designer Hayashi drew a logo for the singer, and she has already hired new staff, with whom she will continue her solo career. The domain and the name of the singer's personal Twitter account were also changed. Egoist's ninth single  was released on May 15, 2019; the song is used as the theme song for the 2019 anime film Kabaneri of the Iron Fortress: The Battle of Unato.

The digital single "Saigo no Hanabira (the meaning of love)", announced during their 2020 tour "Chrysalizion code 404", was released on April 13, 2020, to celebrate Chelly's birthday. The song was composed by Korean composer M2U. Starting with that single, Ryo is no longer Egoist's composer, but will remain as its supervisor. The digital single "Zettai Zetsumei", released on June 16, 2021, is used as the theme song for the video game Azur Lane to celebrate its 4th anniversary on the Chinese server. The song was composed by M2U, returning from his previous work on "Saigo no Hanabira (the meaning of love)".

In September 2021, their first extended play (EP) Bang!!! was revealed to celebrate the band's 10th anniversary. The title track was used as the opening theme for the 2021 anime series Build-Divide -#000000- Code Black, while their past digital singles "Saigo no Hanabira (the meaning of love)" and "Zettai Zetsumei" were included as B-sides along with the new song "Tonight Tonight". Bang!!! was released on November 30, 2021.

In March 2022, the band announced that their new song "Gold" will be used as the opening theme for the 2022 anime series Build-Divide -#FFFFFF- Code White. The song will be pre-released digitally on April 10, 2022 and physically on June 15, 2022 as their tenth single.

Discography

Studio albums

Compilation albums

Extended plays

Singles

Music videos

Notes

References

External links
 

Japanese pop music groups
Musical groups established in 2011
Sacra Music artists
Sony Music Entertainment Japan artists
Anime musical groups
2011 establishments in Japan